Kotliska may refer to the following places in Poland:
Kotliska, Lower Silesian Voivodeship (south-west Poland)
Kotliska, Łódź Voivodeship (central Poland)